By Any Means 2 is the fifteenth mixtape by American rapper Kevin Gates. It was released on September 22, 2017, by his own independent record label Bread Winners' Association and Atlantic Records.

It was released while Gates was incarcerated. Unlike his other mixtapes that were released both for free and for retail, this mixtape was strictly for retail.

Singles
The first single is "What If". It was released on April 4, 2017. The music video was released on September 6, 2019.

The second single is "No Love", which was released on July 20, 2017.

Promotional singles
The first song is "Had To", it was released on September 7, 2017. The music video was released on October 12, 2017, and features Gates' wife along with a Kevin lookalike.

The second song is "Beautiful Scars". It's the only song on the mixtape to have featured guest vocals, which are from PnB Rock. The song was released on September 14, 2017.

The third song is "Imagine That", it was released along with the mixtape on September 22, 2017. The music video was released on September 25, 2017. It features solely Gates' wife and two kids.

Commercial performance
By Any Means 2 debuted at number 100 on the US Billboard 200. In its second week, it rose to its peak position of number 4.

Track listing
Credits adapted from ASCAP.

Charts

Weekly charts

Year-end charts

References

2017 mixtape albums
Kevin Gates albums
Sequel albums